Eunidia cyanoptera is a species of beetle in the family Cerambycidae. It was described by Per Olof Christopher Aurivillius in 1910. It contains the variety Eunidia cyanoptera var. nigripes.

References

Eunidiini
Beetles described in 1910